Barbara "Barb" Perrella (born as Barbara Polski) is an American curler.

Teams

References

External links
 

Living people

American female curlers
American curling champions
Year of birth missing (living people)
21st-century American women